,   is a Japanese professional   basketball player who plays for Fujitsu Red Wave of the Women's Japan Basketball League .  Before joining Fujitsu, she played for Shoin University and won All Japan Intercollegiate Basketball Championship tournament in 2013. She was also selected as a MVP for this Championship tournament. She also played for Japan women's national 3x3 team.

References

1991 births
Living people
3x3 basketball players at the 2020 Summer Olympics
Japanese women's 3x3 basketball players
Japanese women's basketball players
Olympic 3x3 basketball players of Japan
Sportspeople from Kanagawa Prefecture
Asian Games medalists in basketball
21st-century Japanese women